Lokman (Arabic: لقمان) is a Turkish given name for males meaning Favour Of The All-merciful, (Allah). Notable people with the name include:

People
 Lok man Polat, Turkish writer
 Lokman Khan Sherwani (1910–1969), Indian politician
 Lokman Yusof, Malaysian politician
Lokman Yeung, member of Hong Kong Cantopop boy band

See also
 Luqman

Turkish masculine given names